Chris Yer Nangoi (died 9 June 2022) was a Papua New Guinean politician.

Biography
Nangoi earned a degree in electrical and communications engineering from the Papua New Guinea University of Technology in Lae. In 2017, he was elected to the National Parliament, where he represented the Sumkar District for the Pangu Party. From June 2019 to November 2020 he was Minister of Penitentiary Services in the cabinet of Prime Minister James Marape. In 2019, he was one of the founders of the United Labour Party, a party to the Papua New Guinea Trade Union Congress.

Chris Nangoi died in Madang on 9 June 2022.

References

20th-century births
2022 deaths
Year of birth missing
Papua New Guinea University of Technology alumni
Members of the National Parliament of Papua New Guinea
Pangu Party politicians
People from Madang Province
21st-century Papua New Guinean politicians